Events in the year 1919 in Germany.

Incumbents

National level
President
 Vacant to 11 February, then Friedrich Ebert (Social Democrats) Chancellor
 Friedrich Ebert (Social Democrats) ("Head of Government") to 11 February, then Philipp Scheidemann (Social Democrats) to 20 June, then Gustav Bauer (Social Democrats)

Events

 5–15 January – Spartacist uprising
 19 January – German federal election, 1919
 13 February – Scheidemann cabinet are sworn in.
 29 March – University of Hamburg is established.
 21 June – Bauer cabinet are sworn in.
 28 June – The Weimar Republic is forced to sign the Treaty of Versailles under threat of continued Allied advance, which effectively ended World War I.
 12 September – Adolf Hitler spies on the German's Worker Party meeting in 1919 for the Reichswehr, also joining the party.

Undated
 Betz's law is published in 1919, by the German physicist Albert Betz. It indicates the maximum power that can be extracted from the wind, independent of the design of a wind turbine in open flow.
 Forbo Movement Systems, a manufacturer of conveyor and power transmission belts is founded.
 Münchener Lichtspielkunst AG is founded in Munich.

Births
 29 January – Konrad Hesse, German judge (died 2005)
 6 March – Michael Karkoc, German war criminal (died 2019)
 27 March – Peter Selz, German-born art historian (died 2019)
 3 March – Loki Schmidt, German environmentalist, wife of Helmut Schmidt (died 2010)
 6 April – Heinz Schimmelpfennig, German actor (died 2010)
 23 April – Anne Buydens, Belgian-American actress (died 2021)
 3 May – Traute Lafrenz, German-American physician and anthropologist (died 2023)
 16 May – Albert Osswald, German politician (died 1996)
 19 June - Anneliese Rothenberger, German operatic soprano (died 2010)
 7 July – Hans Adolph Buchdahl, German-born Australian physicist (died 2010)
 8 July – Walter Scheel, German politician (died 2016)
 31 August – Eric Koch, German-Canadian author, broadcaster and academic (died 2018)
 30 August – Wolfgang Wagner, German opera director (died 2010)
 5 September – Elisabeth Volkenrath, German Nazi concentration camp supervisor (died 1945)
 22 September – Franz Peter Wirth, German film director (died 1999)
 29 September – Margot Hielscher, German actress and singer (died 2017)
 3 October –  Hella Brock, German musicologist (died 2020)
 7 October – Annemarie Renger, German politician (died 2008)
 6 November – Christoph Probst, German resistance fighter and Catholic martyr (died 1943)
 9 November – John Herberger, German football player and coach (died 2002)
 10 November – Kurt Schmücker, German politician (died 1996)
 14 November – Lisa Otto, German soprano (died 2013)
 30 November – Detlef Kraus, German pianist (died 2008)
 31 December – Artur Fischer, German inventor (died 2016)

Deaths

 4 January – Georg von Hertling, German politician, Chancellor of Germany (born 1843)
 15 January – Rosa Luxemburg, German politician (born 1871)
 15 January – Karl Liebknecht, German politician (born 1871)
 26 January – Hermann von Bönninghausen, German athlete and World War I veteran (born 1888)
 28 January – Franz Mehring, German politician (born 1846)
 21 February:
 Kurt Eisner, German journalist and theatre critic (born 1867)
 Louis Tuaillon, German sculptor (born 1862)
 24 March – Franz Metzner, German sculptor (born 1870)
 25 March – Wilhelm Lehmbruck, German sculptor (born 1881)
 28 May – Friedrich Sigmund Merkel German anatomist and histopathologist (born 1845)
 7 June – Henning von Holtzendorff, German admiral (born 1853)
 2 July – Friedrich Soennecken, German entrepreneur and inventor (born 1848)
 15 July – Hermann Emil Fischer, German chemist (born 1852)
 19 July – Walter Brack, German swimmer (born 1880)
 2 August:
 Christoph Blumhardt, German theologian (born 1842)
 Otto Kissenberth, German World War I flying ace (born 1893)
 Johann von Dallwitz, German politician (born 1855)
 9 August – Ernst Haeckel, German biologist, naturalist, philosopher and physician (born 1834)
 24 August – Friedrich Naumann, German politician (born 1860)
 1 October – Princess Charlotte of Prussia, Prussian princess (born 1860)
 7 November – Hugo Haase, German politician (born 1863)
 11 November – Felix von Hartmann, German bishop of Roman-Catholic Church (born 1851)
 29 November – Fritz Schaper, German sculptor (born 1841)

References

 
Years of the 20th century in Germany
Germany
Germany